Harold James McGee (born October 3, 1951) is an American author who writes about the chemistry and history of food science and cooking. He is best known for his seminal book On Food and Cooking: The Science and Lore of the Kitchen first published in 1984 and revised in 2004.

Education 

McGee was educated at the California Institute of Technology (Caltech), initially to study astronomy, but graduating with a B.S. in Literature in 1973. He went on to do a Ph.D. on the romantic poetry of John Keats supervised by Harold Bloom at Yale University, graduating in 1978.

Career
Before becoming a food science writer, McGee was a literature and writing instructor at Yale. McGee has also written for Nature, Health, The New York Times, the World Book Encyclopedia, The Art of Eating, Food & Wine, Fine Cooking, and Physics Today and lectured on kitchen chemistry at cooking schools, universities, The Oxford Symposia on Food and Cookery, the Denver Natural History Museum and the Fermi National Accelerator Laboratory. For a brief time he wrote a regular column for the New York Times, The Curious Cook, which examined, and often debunked, conventional kitchen wisdom. His latest book is Nose dive: a field guide to the world's smells (2020).

With Dave Arnold and Nils Norén, McGee teaches a three-day class, The Harold McGee Lecture Series, at The French Culinary Institute in New York City.

Awards and honors
McGee is a visiting scholar at Harvard University. His book On Food and Cooking has won numerous awards and is used widely in food science courses at many universities.

Influences
McGee's scientific approach to cooking has been embraced and popularized by chefs and authors such as David Chang and J. Kenji Lopez-Alt.

Personal life
McGee married his college girlfriend Sharon Rugel Long on July 7, 1979; they divorced in 2004. They had two children, son John (born 1986) and daughter Florence (born 1988).

References

American food writers
California Institute of Technology alumni
Yale University alumni
Yale University faculty
Living people
1951 births
James Beard Foundation Award winners